Ashish Kumar Singh Ashu is an Indian politician. He belongs to the Bharatiya Janata Party and is a member of the Uttar Pradesh Legislative Assembly representing the Bilgram-Mallanwan Vidhan Sabha constituency of Uttar Pradesh.He was born in Village Devmanpur Mallawan in a middle class family his father was Principal in an inter college and was active into RSS

References

External links
 Ashish Kumar Singh – Facebook

Living people
People from Hardoi district
Uttar Pradesh MLAs 2017–2022
Bharatiya Janata Party politicians from Uttar Pradesh
Year of birth missing (living people)
Uttar Pradesh MLAs 2022–2027